The 2019 European Throwing Cup was hold on 9–10 March in Šamorín, Slovakia. It is the 19th edition of the athletics competition for throwing events and was jointly organised by the European Athletic Association. The competition featured men's and women's contests in shot put, discus throw, javelin throw and hammer throw. In addition to the senior competitions, there were also under-23 events for younger athletes.

Medal summary

Senior

Under-23

Medal table

Teams Standings

Senior men

Senior women

Under-23 men

Under-23 women

Results

Men

Shot put (senior)

Women

Javelin throw (senior)

Javelin throw (under-23)

References

External links
Official website (dead links)

European Throwing Cup
European Cup Winter Throwing
Winter Throwing
European Cup Winter Throwing